Stanley Carlton Martin (23 November 1889 – 3 May 1917) was an Australian rules footballer who played with University in the Victorian Football League.

Family
The son of Irvin Martin (-1931) and Mary Jane Martin, née Conron, he was born on 23 November 1889 at Dunolly, in Victoria. He was engaged to Olive Ruth Weaver (1888-) in November 1915.

He was killed in action, at Bullecourt, in France on 3 May 1917.

Mabel Alice Martin (1879-1953) was his sister, and Hector Martin (1877-1952) and Arthur Robert Martin (1883-1916) were his older brothers.

Education
Educated at Wesley College, he began a dental degree at the University of Melbourne in 1910.

Football

University (VFL)
While at university he was awarded a full blue in football.
Stan Martin was for three or four years a noted wing player for the University Football Club, and was one of the finest exponents of the running drop-kick that I have ever seen. Being fast, quick and clever, he played many a great game for 'Varsity, and for his open, breezy exhibitions, was a prime favorite with the spectators. The sympathy of all players and lovers of the game is extended to his relatives. (Gerald Brosnan. The Winner, 30 May 1917).<ref>[https://trove.nla.gov.au/newspaper/article/154544341 Noted Footballers Fall, The (Melbourne) Winner) Wednesday, 30 May 1917), p.8.]</ref>

Training Units team (AIF)
He played for the (losing) Australian Training Units team in the famous "Pioneer Exhibition Game" of Australian Rules football, held in London, in October 1916. A news film was taken at the match.The 2019 remastered and colourised version of the original newsreel: 

Military
Having served in the cadets at Wesley College, he enlisted in the First AIF in July 1915. A bayonet instructor, he was killed in action.

See also
 List of Victorian Football League players who died in active service
 1916 Pioneer Exhibition Game

Footnotes

References
 Pioneer Exhibition Game Australian Football: in aid of British and French Red Cross Societies: 3rd Australian Division v. Australian Training Units at Queen's Club, West Kensington, on Saturday, October 28th, 1916, at 3pm, Wightman & Co., (London), 1919.
 Holmesby, Russell & Main, Jim (2007). The Encyclopedia of AFL Footballers. 7th ed. Melbourne: Bas Publishing.
 Main, J. & Allen, D., "Martin, Stanley", pp. 114–115 in Main, J. & Allen, D., Fallen — The Ultimate Heroes: Footballers Who Never Returned From War'', Crown Content, (Melbourne), 2002.
 Australia's Roll of Honor: 309th Casualty List: Killed in Action: Victoria, The Age, (Tuesday, 12 June 1917), p.6.
 Australian War Memorial Roll of Honour: Stanley Carlton Martin (4488)
 World War I Service Record: Stanley Carlton Martin (4488), National Archives of Australia.
 Stanley Carlton Martin (4488), The AIF Project, University of New South Wales, Canberra.
 Roll of the Fallen: Matthews, Stanley Carlton. 1910, The University of Melbourne Record of Active Service of Teachers, Graduates, Undergraduates, Officers, and Servants in the European War, 1914—1918, The University of Melbourne, (Parkville), 1926, p.30.

External links

1889 births
Australian rules footballers from Victoria (Australia)
People educated at Wesley College (Victoria)
University Football Club players
Participants in "Pioneer Exhibition Game" (London, 28 October 1916)
1917 deaths
Australian military personnel killed in World War I
Military personnel from Victoria (Australia)